Matt Hsu is a Taiwanese-Australian musician and composer who records and performs as Matt Hsu's Obscure Orchestra. Hsu was born in 1986 to immigrant Taiwanese parents in Brisbane. As a child he listened to metal and punk music, in an effort to distance himself from Asian stereotypes, but later embraced his Taiwanese heritage, using music to express overcoming internalised racism. In 2020, he became a Queensland Music Awards winner in the world music category and has been identified as "one of the freshest feeling projects in Australian music right now." Matt is also known as the co-founder, trumpet player and songwriter for the folk punk band The Mouldy Lovers. Matt's 2019 debut album 'The Shirt Album' is notable for having been released "in the form of an organic fair-trade T-shirt in place of a CD" with the aim of reducing potential plastic waste. The album features collaborations with noted Tibetan musician Tenzin Choegyal, Triple J Unearthed Sprung Hip Hop winner Blaq Carrie, and Japanese musician Kenta Hayashi. As a 'one-person orchestra' he has performed at TEDx and Australia's BIGSOUND Festival, and has been featured on SBS World News.

Awards

Queensland Music Awards
The Queensland Music Awards (previously known as Q Song Awards) are annual awards celebrating Queensland, Australia's brightest emerging artists and established legends. They commenced in 2006.

 (wins only)
! 
|-
! scope="row"| 2020
| "Make Everything"
| World Award of the Year
| 
| 
|-
! scope="row"| 2022
| "Welcome to the Neighbourhood" (Taiwanese: 就當家裡)
| World Award of the Year
| 
| 
|}

Live ensemble

Formation
In 2020, Matt established a live ensemble  consisting of Brisbane indie musicians, hip-hop artists, classically trained musicians, and multi-disciplinary artists. Also referred to as Matt Hsu's Obscure Orchestra, the  ensemble is "underpinned by gender equity, inclusivity and visibility", and currently comprises 20 core members and frequent guest vocalists, which include culturally diverse, First Nations, disabled, transgender and non-binary artists.

Members

 Yvette Ofa Agapow - 
 Kathryn Bermingham - 
 Laura Hjortshoj-Haller - 
 Lisa Kelly - 
 Jen Horn - 
 Matt Hsu - 
 Andrew Humphreys - 
 Courts Lovell - 
 Fin Nicol-Taylor - 
 Lucie Pegna - 
 Katie Randall - 
 Hannah Reardon-Smith - 
 Saro Roro - 
 Jodie Rottle - 
 Jonathan Sriranganathan - 
 Kaya Tominaga - 
 Caroline Townsend - 
 Fiona Wheeler - 
 Flora Wong -

Past members
 Aimee Harris - 
 Steph McIntyre - 
 Maja Salamon - 
 Alice Wheeler -

Guests and collaborators
 apadalia  - 
 Ashleigh Djokic  - 
 Blaq Carrie  - 
 Tenzin Choegyal - 
 Kenta Hayashi - 
 L-FRESH the Lion - 
 Loopy! 鹿皮 - 
 Mack Ridge - 
 Naavikaran - 
 Anisa Nandaula  - 
 Nardean - 
 Nima Doostkhah - 
 Rina - 
 Sachém - 
 SOLCHLD -

References

21st-century Australian singers
Living people
1986 births
Australian people of Taiwanese descent
Australian male singer-songwriters
Musicians from Brisbane